Setsuko (written:  or  in hiragana) is a feminine Japanese given name. Notable people with the name include:

, later  of Japan
, actress
, Japanese volleyball player
, Japanese actress and model
Setsuko Klossowska de Rola (born 1942), Japanese painter
Setsuko Kobori Japanese table tennis player
Setsuko Matsunaga Nishi (1921–2012), Japanese pioneering community activist and researcher
, Japanese yōga painter
, Japanese volleyball player
, Japanese swimmer
, Japanese novelist
, Japanese–Canadian nuclear disarmament campaigner
, Japanese novelist
, Japanese volleyball player

Fictional characters
Setsuko, a character in the film Grave of the Fireflies

References

Japanese feminine given names